Prescott Commons is a historic building on the campus of Rocky Mountain College in Billings, Montana. It was designed in the Tudor Revival style by Wallace H. Comstock, and built in 1915–1916 thanks in part to a donation from Amos L. Prescott, a financier from New York. It has been listed on the National Register of Historic Places since April 30, 1982.

References

National Register of Historic Places in Yellowstone County, Montana
Tudor Revival architecture in Montana
Gothic Revival architecture in Montana
Buildings and structures completed in 1915
1915 establishments in Montana
Montana State University
Buildings and structures in Billings, Montana
University and college buildings on the National Register of Historic Places in Montana